Reynolds Park is a  park in Woolton, Liverpool. The origins of the park are 200 years ago, it was bequeathed to the City Council in 1926.

History
Reynolds Park lies within an area that in the 19th century was the estate of a series of wealthy local businessmen.

In the late 19th century it came into the possession of the Reynolds family, who had made their fortune in the cotton trade.

In 1929 James Reynolds, last owner of the estate, donated it to the City Corporation, though his daughter continued to live at the park and was active in its development as an amenity.

In 1975 the mansion was destroyed by fire, and was replaced by a housing scheme for the elderly.

Layout
The park comprises  area of open lawns, formal gardens and woodland on a sloping east-facing site.

It is bounded by Church Road to the west, Woolton Hill Road to the north and Woolton Park Road to the south and east, and is surrounded by a high sandstone wall. There are entrances from the various roads, with the main entrances guarded by lodges. These originally gave accommodation for the gardeners, and continued to do so when it became a public park, but are now in private hands. The mansion house has also disappeared and there is private housing on the site.

The park lies within Woolton conservation area contains a number of listed features.

Features
Features include:
A Ha-ha
A Walled garden
A Topiary garden (only one of its kind in the city)
A Sunken garden
An Arboretum (still in formation)
A Wild flower meadow
A Quarry (closed to public but available for biological research)
Woodland areas

Awards
2001 won Public Landscape award
2002 Green Flag Award status
2004 won BALI Landscape award

External links
Reynolds Park Liverpool City Council

Parks and commons in Liverpool